The third season of Family Matters, an American family sitcom created by William Bickley and Michael Warren, premiered on ABC in the U.S. on September 20, 1991, and concluded on May 8, 1992. The season produced by Bickley-Warren Productions, Miller-Boyett Productions, and Lorimar Television, with David W. Duclon as the executive producer. It consists of 25 episodes, most of which were directed by Rich Correll and John Tracy.

Premise

Main cast 

 Reginald VelJohnson as Carl Winslow
 Jo Marie Payton as Harriette Winslow
 Rosetta LeNoire as Estelle Winslow
Darius McCrary as Eddie Winslow
 Kellie Shanygne Williams as Laura Winslow
 Jaimee Foxworth as Judy Winslow
 Bryton McClure as Richie Crawford
 Jaleel White as Steve Urkel
 Telma Hopkins as Rachel Crawford

Episodes

References 

1991 American television seasons
1992 American television seasons